Ingvild Snildal (born 25 August 1988 in Asker, Norway) is a Norwegian swimmer. She won gold in 100 m butterfly at the 2012 European Aquatics Championships. This was her 5th international medal. Her club team is Asker svømmeklubb.  She holds Norwegian medals in long and short course.

Swimming accomplishments 
Gold, silver and bronze medals from European Championships
Bronze from World Championships
49 gold medals in National Championships, 11 silver and 5 bronze
Swam for Norway at the 2008 Olympics and the 2012 Olympics in London.

National records 
She took her first national record on 27 May 2006, with a time of 30,38 in the  50 m backstroke. As of 30 May 2012 she had taken 75 national records. At the moment she holds 12 senior records and 3 junior records, as well as 1 Nordic record.

References 

1988 births
Swimmers at the 2008 Summer Olympics
Swimmers at the 2012 Summer Olympics
Olympic swimmers of Norway
Norwegian female butterfly swimmers
Living people
World Aquatics Championships medalists in swimming
European Aquatics Championships medalists in swimming
20th-century Norwegian women
21st-century Norwegian women